West Stratton is a village in the civil parish of Micheldever in the City of Winchester district of Hampshire, England. According to the Post Office the 2011 Census was included in the civil parish of Kimpton. The village lies close to the M3, which has separated West Stratton from East Stratton. Its nearest town is Winchester, which lies approximately 7.8 miles (10 km) south-west from the village.

Villages in Hampshire